"Only Time Makes It Human" is a song by American singer-songwriter King Princess, released on October 16, 2020.
The song sees Straus delving into the dance-pop genre, and described as "a 21st century take on Kylie Minogue's '00s club mainstay "Can't Get You Out of My Head". It is a break-up song about unrequited love and the "healing power of time". The song's official music video features Straus as a "crying 3D avatar of herself" that Billboard called "trippy" and "far from anything you would have expected from her."

Critical reception
"Only Time Makes It Human" was included on Billboards list of the best LGBTQ songs of 2020.

Track listing
Digital Download
"Only Time Makes It Human" - 3:24

Digital Download - Remix EP
"Only Time Makes It Human" (Kitty Cash Remix) - 3:08
"Only Time Makes It Human" (Yoseppi Remix) - 3:42
"Only Time Makes It Human" (The Blessed Madonna Remix) - 3:43

Personnel
Credits adapted from Tidal.
King Princess – lead and background vocals, songwriting, production, guitar, synthesizer
Nick Long – songwriting
Mike Malchicoff — production, synthesizer, recording engineer
Mark Ronson – co-production, guitar, recording engineer
Jonah Feingold — guitar
Chris Athens — mastering engineer
Josh Gudwin — mixing engineer
"Diamond" Dave Huffman — assistant engineer

Charts

References

2020 singles
King Princess songs
Dance-pop songs
New wave songs
LGBT-related songs